Hartz Creek is a tributary of the Tahltan River, part of the Stikine River watershed in northwest part of the province of British Columbia, Canada. Hartz Creek's watershed's land cover is classified as 44.2% shrubland, 30.7% mixed forest, 20.8% conifer forest, and small amounts of other cover.

Hartz Creek is in the traditional territory of the Tahltan First Nation, of the Tahltan people.

Geography
The creek flows generally south and southwest through wetlands and a forested gorge to the Tahltan River a few kilometres west of Hiusta Lake, the locality of Hiusta Meadow, and the Tahltan Indian reserve "Hiusta's Meadow 2".

See also
List of British Columbia rivers

References 

Cassiar Land District
Level Mountain
Nahlin Plateau
Rivers of British Columbia
Stikine Country
Tahltan